Anthony John Sealy (born 7 May 1959) is an English former footballer who played as a forward.

He graduated from Wallsend Boys Club to Southampton, and appeared for the "Saints" in the 1979 Football League Cup Final after helping the club win promotion out of the Second Division in 1977–78. He joined Crystal Palace in 1979, before moving on to Queens Park Rangers two years later. After a loan spell at Port Vale, he helped QPR to top the Second Division 1982–83. He signed with Fulham in 1984, before ending up at Leicester City a year later. In 1987, he was loaned out to AFC Bournemouth, before moving to Portugal to sign with Sporting Lisbon and later S.C. Braga. He returned to England in 1988, spending brief periods at Brentford, Swindon Town, and Bristol Rovers. He won Third Division championship medals with Bristol Rovers in 1989–90 and with Brentford in 1991–92. In 1991, he played for Finnish side MYPA, before returning to Brentford. He then moved to Hong Kong, playing for Michelotti, Eastern, and Hong Kong FC.

He was appointed manager at Hong Kong FC in 1995. Under his management the club won the Second Division in 1997–98, 1998–99, 2000–01, 2004–05, 2005–06, 2009–10, and won promotion in 2013–14, but failed to establish themselves in the First Division.

Playing career
Sealy was born in Hackney, London, to a Barbadian father, and grew up in Newcastle upon Tyne. He signed his first professional contract with Lawrie McMenemy's Southampton in 1977. He was the second black player to play for Southampton after Alf Charles in 1937. The "Saints" won promotion to the First Division as Second Division runners-up in 1977–78. He appeared as a substitute in the 1979 League Cup final at Wembley, replacing Austin Hayes after 83 minutes; Nottingham Forest won the game 3–2.

Sealy signed with top-flight rivals Crystal Palace on 29 March 1979, then managed by Terry Venables. Whilst at Palace he was sent out on loan to John McGrath's Port Vale in February 1980; after impressing at Vale Park with six goals in 17 Fourth Division games, he returned to Selhurst Park in May of that year. Palace were relegated in 1980–81, and Sealy followed Venables to Second Division Queens Park Rangers for a fee of £80,000 in March 1981.

Sealy made his QPR debut in the 3–1 win over Derby County in March 1981 and went on to play 63 league games, scoring 18 goals. In February 1982, he was once more loaned out to Port Vale, once again impressing with four goals in six games; but the club could not afford to secure his services permanently and he returned to Rangers the following month. In 1982–83, he finished as QPR's top scorer with 16 goals (ahead of Clive Allen and Simon Stainrod), and Rangers topped the Second Division, finishing ten points ahead of Wolverhampton Wanderers.

After a loan spell with Fulham, he moved to Craven Cottage permanently in 1984. Following a ninth-place finish in the Second Division in 1984–85, he again switched clubs, this time settling with Leicester City. He helped Gordon Milne's side to avoid relegation out of the top-flight by a single point in 1985–86, however the "Foxes" were relegated in 1986–87. Following a loan spell with Harry Redknapp's AFC Bournemouth, where he won the 3rd Division title Sealy then left the UK and played for Portuguese side Sporting Lisbon, scoring four goals in the 1987–88 Cup Winners' Cup. He played both legs of the 1987 Supertaça Cândido de Oliveira final victory over Benfica. Lisbon finished fourth in the Primeira Liga in 1987–88, and Sealy moved on to mid-table side S.C. Braga.

He then returned to London to play for Brentford in the Third Division; Steve Perryman's "Bees" missed out on the play-offs by four points in 1988–89, and Sealy moved to Bristol Rovers via Swindon Town. Rovers topped the Third Division in 1989–90 under manager Gerry Francis, two points ahead of rivals City. After the 1990–91 campaign, Sealy moved to Finland with MYPA, returning to Brentford in 1991. Brentford won the Third Division in 1991–92, after which Sealy moved to Hong Kong the next year with Michelotti, Eastern and Hong Kong FC.

Management career
He became manager of Hong Kong FC in 1995, a position he maintained until 2002, when he was promoted to Operations Manager. HKFC became a classic "yo-yo" club, winning promotion as Second Division champions in 1997–98, they actually refused promotion to the First Division, and so again topped the Second Division in 1998–99. After winning the division again in 2000–01, they this time accepted promotion, but only managed four points from twelve games in 2001–02, but were not relegated despite finishing in last place. They finished bottom again in 2002–03, but won the Second Division again in 2004–05 and 2005–06. They finished ninth in the ten team First Division in 2006–07, and were again relegated. They won promotion as Second Division champions in 2009–10, but picked up just five points from 18 games in 2010–11, and so were again relegated. The club finished third in 2011–12, finishing one point behind promoted Southern District RSA. After a fifth-place finish in 2012–13, promotion was secured with a third-place finish in 2013–14.

Personal life
His son, Jack, is also a football player, and has represented Hong Kong at international level.

Career statistics
Source:

Honours
Southampton
Football League Second Division second-place promotion: 1977–78
League Cup runner-up: 1979

Queens Park Rangers
Football League Second Division: 1982–83

AFC Bournemouth
Football League Third Division: 1986–87

Sporting Lisbon
Supertaça Cândido de Oliveira: 1987

Bristol Rovers
Football League Third Division: 1989–90

Brentford
Football League Third Division: 1991–92

Hong Kong FC
Hong Kong Second Division League: 1997–98, 1998–99, 2000–01, 2004–05, 2005–06, 2009–10
Hong Kong Second Division League third-place promotion: 2013–14

References

1959 births
Living people
Footballers from Hackney Central
English people of Barbadian descent
Black British sportspeople
English footballers
Association football forwards
English Football League players
Wallsend Boys Club players
Southampton F.C. players
Crystal Palace F.C. players
Port Vale F.C. players
Queens Park Rangers F.C. players
Fulham F.C. players
Leicester City F.C. players
AFC Bournemouth players
English expatriate footballers
Expatriate footballers in Portugal
Sporting CP footballers
S.C. Braga players
Brentford F.C. players
Swindon Town F.C. players
Bristol Rovers F.C. players
Expatriate footballers in Finland
Myllykosken Pallo −47 players
Expatriate footballers in Hong Kong
English football managers
Expatriate football managers in Hong Kong
Sun Hei SC players
Eastern Sports Club footballers
Hong Kong FC players
People with acquired permanent residency of Hong Kong
English emigrants to Hong Kong
English expatriate sportspeople in Hong Kong